Bambalapitiya is a southern coastal neighbourhood of Colombo, Sri Lanka.

The area also known as Colombo 4, spans about   along Galle Road. The western boundary of the suburb is the Indian Ocean and it is bordered to the east by Havelock Town, the north by Kollupitiya, and to the south by Wellawatte. It falls within the Kollupitiya (Colpetty) Ward of the Colombo Municipal Council.

Educational institutions 

Bambalapitiya is regarded as an educational hub. Many private sector schools and colleges such as ICBS, ICBT Campus, IDM Computer Studies, ESOFT Computer Studies, and PIBT are in this area. It is home to educational establishments including Lindsay Girls School, Muslim Ladies College, St. Peter's College, Holy Family Convent, Visakha Vidyalaya and Colombo Hindu College.

Diplomatic missions 

 Honorary Consulate General of Greece
 Consulate of Singapore
 Honorary Consulate of Ireland

Transport
The A2 Highway (Galle Road) and Marine Drive, runs through the suburb, parallel to the coast.

The Bambalapitiya railway station services the area. It is the fourth station on the Coastal line.

Commercial 
 Majestic City and Pearl Grand Town, the seven-storey commercial and shopping complex.

References

External links 
Detailed map of Bambalapitiya vicinity and Sri Lanka
Unity Plaza

Populated places in Western Province, Sri Lanka